Stăuceni is a Moldovan commune, located  in the north-east of Chişinău, the capital of Moldova.

Stăuceni commune is part of the Chişinău Municipality. It is composed of two villages, Goianul Nou and Stăuceni.

Wines from Stăuceni
Grape varieties grown in Stăuceni include Aligote, Fetească, Rkatsiteli, Sauvignon blanc, Cabernet Sauvignon, Merlot and Pinot noir as well as a number of varieties used for table grapes. Indigenous varieties include Plavay, also known as Belan and Plakun.

References

External links
 Informatii despre Stauceni 
 Stauceni on OpenStreetMap

Communes of Chișinău Municipality